Maynooth University Town F.C. are a football club from Maynooth, County Kildare, in Ireland. The club compete in the Leinster Senior League. In 2021, they reached the quarter-finals of the FAI Cup where they lost 4-0 against Bohemian.

References

Association football clubs established in 2014
Leinster Senior League (association football) clubs